Federico Poggio (born 24 April 1998) is an Italian swimmer. He competed at the 2020 Summer Olympics in Tokyo, Japan, where he placed 15th in the semifinals of the 100 metre breaststroke event with a time of 59.91 seconds after qualifying for the semifinals with a time of 59.33 seconds in the preliminary heats. In February 2022, he announced he was refocusing on coursework in sports science as he worked through some physical injuries that were affecting his swimming performances.

At the 2022 European Aquatics Championships, held in August in Rome, Poggio won the silver medal in the 100 metre breaststroke with a time of 58.98 seconds.

References

1998 births
Living people
People from Voghera
Swimmers at the 2020 Summer Olympics
Italian male swimmers
Olympic swimmers of Italy
Italian male breaststroke swimmers
Sportspeople from the Province of Pavia
21st-century Italian people
European Aquatics Championships medalists in swimming